The 1897–98 season was Newcastle United's fifth season in the Football League Second Division. Newcastle finished the season in second place and were promoted to the First Division when the division was expanded from 16 to 18 teams.

Appearances and goals

Competitions

League

FA Cup

Test Matches

Friendlies

Matches

League

FA Cup

Test Matches

Friendlies

External links
Newcastle United – Historical Football Kits
Season Details – 1897–98 – toon1892
NUFC.com Archives – Match Stats – 1897–98
Newcastle United 1897–1898 Home – statto.com

Newcastle United F.C. seasons
Newcastle United